Esme Melville (born Esme Grace Mount-Melville, 23 July 1918 – 14 September 2006) was an Australian theatre, television and film actress. At the Tropfest awards for 2003 she won Best Actor – Female for her role of Granma in the short film, Forbidden. At the 2007 Australian Film Institute Awards she was nominated for Best Supporting Actress for her role of Miss Collard in Romulus, My Father. Her theatre roles included Mrs. Bedwin in Oliver! (1961–62, 1966–67). Melville had four separate ongoing roles on television soap opera, Neighbours, including as Rose Belker during 2006. She died on 14 September 2006 after a short illness, aged 88.

Biography
Esme Melville was born as Esme Grace Mount-Melville on 23 July 1918 and grew up in Norwood. Her mother was Margaret Mount-Melville. Melville started as a theatre actress in Adelaide in 1939 – just before the outbreak of World War II. On 11 May 1944 Melville enrolled into the Women's Royal Australian Naval Service as a transport driver and was honourably discharged on 13 September 1946 from Victoria Barracks in Melbourne. She remained in that city and from 1956 worked at St Martins Theatre for eight years.

Her television credits of the 1970s included various guest roles in the Crawford Productions police dramas Homicide, Division 4, Matlock Police and Bluey. Other appearances included guest roles in Crawford's adventure series Ryan (1973), and in the miniseries Power Without Glory (1976). Later television appearances include Cop Shop (1978), Sons and Daughters (1982), Special Squad (1984), The Flying Doctors (1986), Sugar and Spice (1988), Phoenix (1992), Round the Twist (1993), Wedlocked (1994), The Damnation of Harvey McHugh (1994), The Man from Snowy River (1994), Mercury (1996), Driven Crazy (1998), Eugenie Sandler P.I. (2000), SeaChange (2000), Stingers (2000), The Secret Life of Us (2001), miniseries Bootleg (2002), miniseries After the Deluge (2003), Real Stories (2006). She also made frequent appearances in televisions series Prisoner, Blue Heelers, and Neighbours. For the latter series she portrayed four different characters starting in 1986 with Mrs. York and most recently, in 2006, as the hard-of-hearing, Rose Belker. Her theatre roles include Serita in Waiting in the Wings, Mrs Grey in The Secretary Bird (1969) and Mrs. Bedwin in Oliver (1961–62, 1966–67).

Melville also acted in several feature films including Alvin Purple Rides Again (1974), Dimboola (1979), I Can Jump Puddles (1981) (TV), Squizzy Taylor (1982), Annie's Coming Out (1984), Niel Lynne (1985), The Four Minute Mile (1988) (TV), Mull (1989), Spotswood (1992), Say a Little Prayer (1993), The Heartbreak Kid (1993), Dead End (1999), Siam Sunset (1999), A Telephone Call for Genevieve Snow (2000), Dalkeith (2001), Crackerjack (2002), Forbidden (2003), Romulus, My Father (2007). At the Tropfest awards for 2003 she won Best Actor – Female for her role of Granma in the short film, Forbidden. At the 2007 Australian Film Institute Awards she was nominated for Best Supporting Actress for her role of Miss Collard in Romulus, My Father. She worked in student films, independent short films, did voice-overs and appeared in TV ads. Esme Melville had died on 14 September 2006 after a short illness, aged 88.

Filmography

Film

Television

Theatre

Credits:

References

External links

Interview

1918 births
2006 deaths
Australian film actresses
Australian stage actresses
Australian soap opera actresses
Actresses from Adelaide